Shalom Dovber is a Jewish name.
Two well-known personalities carry this name:
Shalom Dovber Schneersohn, fifth Lubavitcher Rebbe
Shalom Dovber Wolpo, a Chabad Rabbi from the Land of Israel